The EJHL South (formerly Southeast Junior Hockey League) was an American Tier III Junior ice hockey league sanctioned by USA Hockey. The league had eight teams located in Florida, North Carolina, Virginia and Georgia.  With the elimination by USA Hockey of the Junior A, B and C labels, at the start of the 2011–12 season, the SEJHL was to become the Southern Atlantic Hockey League.  This progression was approved by USA Hockey as the SAHL was preparing to compete at the top level of Tier III Junior hockey. However, unprecedented developments allowed the SAHL to be included in a partnership with the Eastern Junior Hockey League and to operate under the infrastructure and guidance of the EJHL as an affiliate member organization. The EJHL agreed to govern the league for a minimum of three seasons and the league would be called the "EJHL South" as an affiliate operation of the EJHL.

History 
The SEJHL began play in 2006 as USA Hockey-sanctioned Tier III Junior C league. On January 18, 2010 the SEJHL, in conjunction with USA Hockey, announced that beginning with the 2010–11 season the SEJHL would be a Jr. B league. With the elimination of Junior A, B and C by USA Hockey prior to the 2011–12 season, the league began to operate as the EJHL South under an affiliation with the Eastern Junior Hockey League until its dissolution at the end of the 2012–13 season. The EJHL folded after many of its teams left to form the United States Premier Hockey League (USPHL) leading to the EJHL south to reorganize and take the name Eastern Elite Hockey League. However, prior to the EEHL's first season the league merged with the new USPHL to form the Elite Division.

Teams

Past Champions
 2006–07: Space Coast Hurricanes
 2007–08: Atlanta Junior Knights
 2008–09: Atlanta Junior Knights 
 2009–10: Atlanta Junior Knights
 2010–11: Atlanta Junior Knights
 2011–12: Hampton Roads Whalers
 2012–13: Atlanta Junior Knights

National Champions from the SEJHL
 2006–07 Jr. C: Space Coast Hurricanes
 2008–09 Jr. C: Atlanta Junior Knights - National Runner-up
 2009–10 Jr. C: Atlanta Junior Knights

External links
EJHL South Records

References

Junior ice hockey leagues in the United States